Henry T. Bream Sr. (November 21, 1899 – June 17, 1990) was a minor league baseball player and a collegiate American football, basketball and baseball player and coach.
He served as the head football coach at Gettysburg College in Gettysburg, Pennsylvania from 1927 to 1951.
He also served as the school's head men's basketball coach at from 1927 to 1955.

References

External links
 Gettysburg manuscripts profile
 
 

1899 births
1990 deaths
Basketball coaches from Pennsylvania
Gettysburg Bullets football players
Gettysburg Bullets baseball players
Hanover Raiders players
Gettysburg Bullets football coaches
Gettysburg Bullets men's basketball coaches
Gettysburg Bullets baseball coaches
High school football coaches in Pennsylvania
People from Adams County, Pennsylvania
Players of American football from Pennsylvania